Animal Mother may refer to:

 Animal Mother, a character in the 1987 film Full Metal Jacket
 Animal Mother (album), a 2014 album by Today Is the Day